Ana Lucía Fleitas Martínez (born 8 August 1992) is a Paraguayan footballer who plays as a midfielder for Cerro Porteño. She was a member of the Paraguay women's national team.

International career
Fleitas represented Paraguay at the 2008 FIFA U-17 Women's World Cup and two South American U-20 Women's Championship editions (2010 and 2012). At senior level, she capped during the 2010 South American Women's Football Championship. She also played the 2014 Copa América Femenina.

International goals
Scores and results list Paraguay's goal tally first

References

1992 births
Living people
Women's association football midfielders
Paraguayan women's footballers
Paraguay women's international footballers
Cerro Porteño players